This is a list of seasons completed by the University of Alaska Anchorage men's ice hockey team. 

Alaska Anchorage has made three NCAA tournament appearances in its history, all in consecutive years. As of 2018 the Seawolves are the last independent team to receive a bid to the NCAA tournament.

Season-by-season results

* Winning percentage is used when conference schedules are unbalanced.

Footnotes

References

 
Lists of college men's ice hockey seasons in the United States
Alaska Anchorage Seawolves ice hockey seasons